Kaia Kanepi was the defending champion, but decided not to participate.

Serena Williams won the title, defeating Anastasia Pavlyuchenkova in the final 6–2, 6–1.

Seeds

Draw

Finals

Top half

Bottom half

Qualifying

Seeds

Qualifiers

Lucky losers
 ''' Lesia Tsurenko

Qualifying draw

First qualifier

Second qualifier

Third qualifier

Fourth qualifier

External links
 Main draw
 Qualifying draw

Brisbane International - Singles
Women's Singles